The 1938 Oregon Webfoots football team represented the University of Oregon in the Pacific Coast Conference (PCC) during the 1938 college football season.  In their first season under head coach Tex Oliver, the Webfoots compiled a 4–5 record (4–4 in PCC, fifth), and were outscored 138 to 69. 

Home games were played on campus at Hayward Field in Eugene and at Multnomah Stadium in Portland.

Schedule

References

External links
 Game program: Oregon at Washington State – September 24, 1938
 WSU Libraries: Game video – Oregon at Washington State – September 24, 1938

Oregon
Oregon Ducks football seasons
Oregon Webfoots football